The Tony LeVier Flight Test Safety Award, named in honor of test pilot Tony LeVier, was established by the Flight Test Safety Committee to pay recognition to people who have significantly contributed to the safety of flight test operations. This annual award, which can be presented to an individual or team is presented by Gentex Corporation at the Society of Experimental Test Pilots at their annual awards banquet.

To be considered for the award, nominees must have contributed in a significant way to the flight test safety community over a period of time. The nominee must have made a singular safety achievement involved in the saving of human life, a flight test program or test aircraft, and may be nominated only where safety rules were not broken.

Past recipients
Recipients of the SETP Tony LeVier Flight Test Safety Award include:
1999 – Eric E. Fiore, Bombardier Aerospace
2000 – Rodrigo J. Huete, FAA
2001 – David Houle, Former President of SFTE
2002 – Bruce A. Peterson
2003 – Auto ACAS Team
2004 – LCDR William Patton, Aviation Safety Officer and Program Manager and Mr. Thomas Roberts, Research, Development, Test, and Evaluation Safety Manager, Naval Test Wing Atlantic (NTWL) Safety Office
2005 – Ralph Mohr, The Boeing Company
2006 - Terry White
2007 - John E. Cashman
2008 - Flight Test Safety Database Team: Barton Henwood, NASA/DFRC; Rodrigo Huete, FAA (Ret);  John Hed, FAA; Greg Lewis, National Test Pilot School
2009 - Jerry “Mac” McCawley, Lockheed Martin
2010 - Dave Downey
2011 - Thomas Roberts
2012 - The Boeing Company 787 Flight Test Team: Mike Carriker, Randy Neville, Jennifer-Ellen Gessler; Federal Aviation Administration 787 Flight Test Team: Eugene Arnold and John Hed
2013 - Art Tomassetti
2014 - Terry Lutz, Airbus
2015 - Larry Flynn, Gulfstream Aerospace
2016 - Warren A. Hansen, Textron Aviation
2017 - Mark Skoog, NASA Armstrong Flight Research Center
2018 - Terrance Pearce, Bombardier Aerospace
2019 - Barbara Gordon, U.S. Naval Test Pilot School and LT Mark Hargrove, USN
2020 - Darren McDonald, The Boeing Company
2021 - Ben Luther, Nova Systems
2022 - Giorgio Clementi, ITPS Canada

See also

 List of aviation awards

References

See also
Flight Test Safety Committee Page
SETP Criteria
Recipient List

Aviation awards